Sitton Valley is a valley in Oregon County in the U.S. state of Missouri.

Sitton Valley has the name of Warren Sitton, a pioneer citizen.

References

Valleys of Oregon County, Missouri
Valleys of Missouri